Wuchang railway station is a railway station of Chengdu–Kunming Railway in Jiajiang County, Leshan, Sichuan, China.

See also
Chengdu–Kunming Railway

Railway stations in Sichuan
Railway stations in China opened in 1965